Carabus anatolicus is a species of ground beetle from family Carabidae found on Cyprus and in Near East. The black coloured species can also be found in Turkey.

References

anatolicus
Beetles of Asia
Beetles described in 1857